The 1967 Paris–Nice was the 25th running of the Paris–Nice cycling stage race, often known as the Race to the Sun. It started on 8 March in Athis-Mons, south of Paris, and ended on 15 March in Nice and consisted of eight stages, including an individual time trial. A total of 96 riders from twelve teams entered the race, which was won by Briton Tom Simpson of the Peugeot–BP–Michelin team.

Simpson became the first British rider to win the Paris–Nice general classification. In the other race classifications, Bernard Guyot of Pelforth–Wild–Lejeune won the mountains classification, Jean-Claude Wuillemin of Pelforth–Wild–Lejeune took the points classification green jersey. Pelforth–Wild–Lejeune finished as the winners of the team classification, which ranks each of the twelve teams contesting the race by lowest cumulative time.

Teams
Twelve teams were invited to participate in the 1967 edition of the Paris–Nice. One of the teams, Beer 33-Gitane, was amateur. Each team sent a squad of eight riders, which meant that the race started with a peloton of 96 cyclists. From the riders that began the race, 83 made it to the finish in Nice.

The teams entering the race were:

Stages

Stage 1
8 March 1967 — Athis-Mons to Châteaurenard,

Stage 2
9 March 1967 — Châteaurenard to Château-Chinon,

Stage 3
10 March 1967 — Lucy-sur-Cure to Saint-Étienne,

Stage 4
11 March 1967 — Saint-Étienne to Bollène,

Stage 5
12 March 1967 — Bollène to Marignane,

Stage 6
13 March 1967 — Marignane to Hyères,

Stage 7
14 March 1967 — Hyères to Antibes,

Stage 8
15 March 1967 — Antibes to Nice,  individual time trial (ITT)

Final general classification

References

Paris-Nice
Paris–Nice
March 1967 sports events in Europe
1967 Super Prestige Pernod